Bibya Chihi is a Tunisian politician. She was the Minister of Women, Family, Children, and Senior Citizens under former President Zine El Abidine Ben Ali. Prior to this, she was the CEO of the Société Nationale de Distribution des Produits Pétroliers.

References

Government ministers of Tunisia
Living people
Year of birth missing (living people)
Place of birth missing (living people)